Rebecca McConnell (née Henderson; born 27 September 1991) is an Australian mountain biker. She represented Australia at the 2012, 2016 and 2020 Summer Olympics in the Mountain Bike Cross Country event. She came 28th at the 2020 Olympics.

McConnell won a bronze medal at the 2019 and 2020 Mountain Bike World Championships.

Personal
Nicknamed Bec, McConnell was born on 27 September 1991 in Canberra, Australia. She attended Monash Primary School before going to high school at Mackillop Catholic College. , she lives in Canberra, Australia.

She married her coach and partner, Daniel McConnell, in 2017; he is also an Olympian. He qualified for the Tokyo 2020 Olympics and came 30th in the Men's cross country event.

Cycling
McConnell is a mountain biker, specialising in cross country events. She started cycling when she was twelve years old. She is coached by Dan McConnell, an Australian male cyclist who was selected to represent Australia at the 2012 Summer Olympics. Her primary cycling base is Canberra She is a member of the Canberra Off Road Cyclists and Vikings Cycling Club ACT. , she was 2nd in the Under 23 World Cup series in 2012 and she is currently ranked 32nd in the World.

McConnell finished 1st at the 2011 U23 Australian Championships in Adelaide, Australia. She finished 1st at the 2011 U23 Oceania Championships in Shepparton, Australia. She finished 7th at the 2011 U23 UCI MTB World Cup in Dalby Forest, England.

McConnell finished 3rd at the 2012 U23 UCI MTB World Cup 5 in Mont Sainte Anne, Canada. She finished 2nd at the 2012 U23 UCI MTB World Cup 4 in La Bresse, France. She finished 13th at the 2012 U23 UCI MTB World Cup 3 in Nové Mesto na Morave, Czech Republic. She finished 3rd at the 2012 U23 UCI MTB World Cup 2 in Houffalize, Belgium.

McConnell has been selected to represent Australia at the 2012 Summer Olympics in the Mountain Bike Cross Country — Women event. She was one of four Canberra cyclists from three different cycling disciplines selected to represent Australia at the Games. Her family was scheduled to travel to London to watch her compete.

McConnell finished third in the cross-country at the 2019 World Championships in Mont Sainte Anne. She repeated her result again at the 2020 World Championships in Leogang.

McConnell was selected to represent Australian in mountain biking at the Tokyo Olympics. She finished the Olympics in 28th place.

2022 UCI MOUNTAIN BIKE WORLD CUP 
1st CZ MERCEDES-BENZ UCI MTB WORLD CUP - XCO/XCC Nove Mesto Na Morave / WC

1st DE MERCEDES-BENZ UCI MTB WORLD CUP - XCO/XCC Albstadt / WC

1st BR MERCEDES-BENZ UCI MTB WORLD CUP - XCO/XCC Petropolis / WC

2nd Biker Final Standing 2022

References

1991 births
Australian female cyclists
Commonwealth Games bronze medallists for Australia
Cyclists at the 2012 Summer Olympics
Cyclists at the 2014 Commonwealth Games
Cyclists at the 2016 Summer Olympics
Living people
Olympic cyclists of Australia
Sportswomen from the Australian Capital Territory
Cyclists from the Australian Capital Territory
Commonwealth Games medallists in cycling
ACT Academy of Sport alumni
Cyclists at the 2020 Summer Olympics
20th-century Australian women
21st-century Australian women
Medallists at the 2014 Commonwealth Games